Molly Easo Smith (born 1958 in Chennai, India) is an Indian-American professor and scholar of Shakespeare and Renaissance drama, and academic administrator.

Biography
Born in Chennai (formerly Madras) in India, Dr. Smith graduated from Ethiraj College for Women and Madras Christian College in the University of Madras, with BA and MA degrees in English, respectively, and from Auburn University with a PhD in English Literature in 1988. Smith has written two books and several articles on Shakespeare and Renaissance drama.  Her research and teaching interests include the sixteenth and seventeenth centuries, Shakespeare, Women in Drama, and the development of theatre.  She has held faculty posts at a number of colleges, including Ithaca College, St. Louis University, the University of Aberdeen in Scotland, and Stephen F. Austin State University. She served as the Dean of the College of Arts and Sciences at Seton Hall University, Provost at Wheaton College, and two years as the president of Manhattanville College.

Smith served on the Board of Trustees at Fairleigh Dickinson University and on the Executive Committee of the International Association of University Presidents, where she led an initiative to develop women as academic leaders globally. She was recognized by the Westchester Business Council as "Businesswoman of the Year" at the annual Awards Banquet in April 2011. She was also recognized for her leadership in education by the National Federation of Indian Americans and by the Kerala Center.  She was featured in the New York Times as one among a handful of foreign-born presidents of US Colleges and Universities.

While at Seton Hall, she received a vote of no confidence from a minority of the college of arts & sciences faculty after releasing a Seton Hall professor from administrative duties.  From 2006 to 2008, she served as the provost of Wheaton College in Massachusetts and served as the eleventh President of Manhattanville College from 2009 to 2011.

At the end of her first year at Manhattanville, in May 2010, students staged a protest in response to the resignation of two administrators, the academic dean and acting vice president for student affairs, and vice president of enrollment. According to a local newspaper, the Harrison Patch, "Most of the outrage was focused toward the school's newly inaugurated president, Dr. Molly Easo Smith. Students say that Smith, who has only been president since April 7, 2010, has cut programs and made changes without taking input from students and staff". The Harrison Patch also noted that, with respect to the resigning administrators, "Many of the students protesting were international students who said that [one of those departing admins] had played a major part of their decision to come to the school."

At the time of her resignation in 2011, a communique from Robert Hall, Chairman of the Board of Trustees, stated: "the Manhattanville College Board of Trustees is announcing an executive management transition. Molly Easo Smith, Ph.D. has decided to step down from her role as President effective today, May 31." J.J. Pryor, a school spokesperson, said in a statement that Smith left after achieving specific goals and objectives for which she was appointed by the Board of Trustees in 2009.  "This includes the recruitment of a strong leadership team, refocusing the college's commitment to its core values of academic excellence, civic engagement and social action and the engagement of alumni to the Manhattanville College community."

In 2019, Dr. Easo Smith served as interim Provost at Stonehill College. In 2020, she was announced as the inaugural provost of Thomas More University. As of 2022, she is a professor in the English department at the university.

Books
Breaking Boundaries: Politics and Play in the Drama of Shakespeare and his Contemporaries (1998)
The Darker World Within: Evil in the Tragedies of Shakespeare and his Successors (1991)

References

1958 births
Living people
Manhattanville College faculty
Indian emigrants to the United States
Writers from Chennai
Auburn University alumni
University of Madras alumni
American women writers of Indian descent
American academics of Indian descent
American women academics
21st-century American women
Wheaton College (Massachusetts) faculty